The silky cuscus (Phalanger sericeus) is a species of marsupial in the family Phalangeridae. It is found in Indonesia and Papua New Guinea.

Names
It is known as atwak, añ, sosus, or beŋ-tud in the Kalam language of Papua New Guinea.

Habitat
The silky cuscus is found in abundance across high elevations in the central mountains of the island of New Guinea, Indonesia, and Papua New Guinea.

References

Possums
Mammals described in 1907
Taxa named by Oldfield Thomas
Taxonomy articles created by Polbot
Marsupials of New Guinea